Oudenbosch is a railway station located in Oudenbosch, Netherlands. The station was opened on October 20, 1854, and is located on the Antwerp–Lage Zwaluwe railway. The train services are operated by Nederlandse Spoorwegen.

Train services
The following services currently call at Oudenbosch:
2x per hour local service (Sprinter) Dordrecht - Roosendaal

External links
NS website 
Dutch Public Transport journey planner 

Railway stations in North Brabant
Railway stations opened in 1854
Halderberge
1854 establishments in the Netherlands
Railway stations in the Netherlands opened in the 19th century